The Indiana State Sycamores baseball team is the NCAA Division I baseball program of Indiana State University, located in Terre Haute, Indiana. It is a member of the Missouri Valley Conference. The team last played in the NCAA Division I Baseball Championship in 2019. Their first season was 1896. The Sycamores have had 12 All-Americans, 26 Major Leaguers, and more than 2,070 victories. The team's most successful season was in 1986, when the team appeared in the College World Series and finished with a record of 48–21. The Sycamores have appeared in the NCAA Division I Baseball Championship in 1979, 1983, 1984, 1987, 1989, 1995, 2012, 2014, 2019 and 2021.

They appeared in the NAIA Baseball World Series in 1958 and won the NAIA "Midwest" District Championship in 1964. In 2013, the 1958 team was honored on the 55th Anniversary of their appearance at the NAIA Baseball World Series.

Past coaches include John Wooden, Bob Warn, former ISU and MiLB'er Paul L. Wolf, and Wally Marks. The Sycamores play their home games at Sycamore Stadium at Bob Warn Field (900) and are coached by Mitch Hannahs; Hannahs was named as the 29th head coach on July 25, 2013 and returns to his alma mater following a 9-year stint as the head coach at Lincoln Trail College in Robinson, Illinois. Hannahs was an assistant at Indiana State from 1995–1999 and the 2001 season. An All-American 2B for the Sycamores, Hannahs spent three seasons (1989–1991) in the Milwaukee Brewers system, spending two seasons in AA-ball with the El Paso Diablos of the Texas League.

Division I NCAA tournament results
The Sycamores have appeared in 11 NCAA Division I Baseball Championships. Their combined record is 11–22; they won the 1986 Mideast Regional and reached Regional Finals in 1989 and 2019.

National awards (1)

All-Americans (16)

Most Valuable Player

Conference (reg. season) 
2012 Jeremy Lucas, C Missouri Valley Conference

Conference Tournament (5) 
1979 Wallace Johnson, 2B Missouri Valley Conference
1986 Dave Travis, DH Missouri Valley Conference
1989 Larry Russell, OF Missouri Valley Conference
1995 Jeff Leaman, 3B/P Missouri Valley Conference
2019 Chris Ayers, OF/DH Missouri Valley Conference

All-Conference (113) 
Only players selected for the conference first team are displayed; for second team and honorable mention, please consult the Indiana State baseball media guide at www.gosycamores.com

All-Indiana Collegiate Conference (35)

All-Missouri Valley Conference (85)

Conference Speciality

Pitcher of the Year (1) 
Geremy Guerrero - 2021

Defensive Player of the Year (2) 
Tyler Wampler - 2014
Jake Means - 2019

MVC Newcomer of the Year (5) 
Rich Angell – 1998
Clint Barmes – 2000
Tim Brewer – 2005
Collin Liberatore - 2019
Aaron Beck - 2021

MVC Freshman of the Year (1) 
Mitch Stetter – 2000
Ryan Keaffaber – 2014

Career leaders

Batting average

 Bird appeared in one game for the baseball team, going 1-for-2 with 2 RBI.

Hits

 Bob Zeihen holds the National NCAA career record for triples (32)

HRs

Wins

ERA

Strikeouts

Sycamores in MLB
While long-time baseball great Tommy John is an alumnus of Indiana State; he did not play baseball for the Sycamores as he attended classes around his professional baseball schedule. Future New York Yankees-great, Don Mattingly, declined his baseball scholarship from Coach Bob Warn after he was drafted by the New York Yankees.

Bill Hayes had 2 "cups-of-coffee" in the majors but would go on to a long career as a Minor League manager before beginning a 15-year coaching career with the San Francisco Giants, winning 3x World Series Championships (2010, 2012, 2014); in Dec 2014, he was named 1st-base coach for the Giants. Long-time college basketball coach Ron Felling was a 2-year letterman for the Sycamores.

In addition, basketball legend Larry Bird appeared in two games for the Sycamores, in the spring of 1979, following the NCAA men's basketball tournament.

Indiana State has placed over 75 Sycamores in the Minors, of which 27 have reached the Major Leagues or Negro Major Leagues. They are by order of appearance:

Coaching leaders

Coaching honors

Conference Coach of the Year (9)

Hall(s) of Fame
 1987 – Paul Wolf (Coach) – Indiana Baseball Hall of Fame
 1988 – Don Jennings (Player) – Indiana Baseball Hall of Fame
 1989 – Howard Sharpe (Player) – Indiana Baseball Hall of Fame
 1990 – Bob Warn (Coach) – Indiana Baseball Hall of Fame
 2000 – Bob Warn (Coach) – Iowa Western Hall of Fame
 2002 - Junius "Rainey" Bibbs (Player) - Indiana State University Hall of Fame
 2002 – 1986 Baseball Team (College World Series participant) – Indiana State University> </ref>
 2002 – Bob Warn (Coach) – Indiana State University Hall of Fame
 2002 – Paul Gries (Player) – Indiana Baseball Hall of Fame
 2003 – Bob Warn (Coach) – American Baseball Coach's Association
 2007 – Brian Dorsett (Player) – Indiana State University Hall of Fame
 2008 – Brian Dorsett (Player) – Indiana Baseball Hall of Fame
 2011 – Junius "Rainey" Bibbs (Player) – Indiana Baseball Hall of Fame
 2021 - Sean Manaea (Player) – Indiana State University Hall of Fame
 2022 - Steve Ruckman (Player) - Frontier League Hall of Fame

See also
 List of NCAA Division I baseball programs

References

External links

 
Baseball teams established in 1896